HMS Hind was a 10-gun two-masted Hind-class sloop of the Royal Navy, designed by Joseph Allin and built by Philemon Perry at Blackwall on the Thames River , England and launched on 19 April 1744.

She was lost, presumed to have foundered, off Louisbourg, Nova Scotia in September 1747.

References

 McLaughlan, Ian. The Sloop of War 1650-1763. Seaforth Publishing, 2014. .
 Rif Winfield (2007). British Warships in the Age of Sail, 1714-1792: Design, Construction, Careers and Fates. Seaforth Publishing. .

Sloops of the Royal Navy
1744 ships